For Real is a 2009 film which follows the point of view of six-year-old Shruti (Zoya Hassan). Family discord has a deep impact on her and she starts feeling that her mother (Sarita Choudhury) is an alien from the Orion galaxy who has exchanged places with her own mother.

Plot
Six-year-old Shruti believes her mother, Priya, has been replaced by an alien from the Orion galaxy. She turns to her brother for help, but he doesn't believe her. Her father as always is so wrapped up in his work that he remains unavailable to her. Unable to bear the absence of her real mother, Shruti decides to set out and get her real mother back.

This is an intense movie dealing with the impact of seemingly trivial family tiffs on the tender psychology of a child. It portrays the world from the standpoint of a little child and shows how children perceive various things in life.

Cast
 Sarita Choudhury as Priya Singh
 Adil Hussain as Ravi Shukla
 Zoya Hassan as Shruti Shukla
 Sriharsh Sharma as Paras Shukla
 Sameer Dharmadhikari as Deepak Choudhury

Production and reception
For Real was directed, produced and screenwritten by Sona Jain.

The film was well received, drawing praise as the only English-language film in the Indian Panorama section of the 40th International Film Festival of India. It took almost five years for the film to find sponsors and it was finally released in 2009.

It received four awards at the Asian Festival of First Films in Singapore.

References

External links
 
 
 For Real at oneindia.in

2009 films
2000s English-language films